The 2009 NCAA Division I men's soccer tournament was a tournament of 48 teams from NCAA Division I who played for the NCAA Championship in soccer . The semifinals and final were held at WakeMed Soccer Park in Cary, North Carolina. All the other games were played at the home field of the higher seeded team (indicated by * for non-seeded teams). The final was held on December 13, 2009 with Virginia defeating Akron, 3–2 in a penalty shoot-out, following a goalless regulation and two overtimes.

The bracket was announced November 16, 2009. The tournament started on November 19. The second round was played on November 22. The third round was played on November 29. The Regional Finals were played on December 4 and 5.

Regional 1

Regional 2

Regional 3

Regional 4

College Cup – WakeMed Soccer Park, Cary, North Carolina

Goal scorers 
4 goals
  Will Bates – Virginia
3 goals

  Anthony Ampaipitakwong – Akron
  Luke Gorczyca – Drake
  Alex Dixon – North Carolina
  David Walker – UC Santa Barbara
  Zack Schilawski – Wake Forest

2 goals

  Kyle Bekker – Boston College
  Karl Reddick – Boston College
  Kevin Shrout – Drake
  Garrett Webb – Drake
  Ryan Finley – Duke
  Darren Yeagle – Indiana
  Billy Cortes – Maryland
  Casey Townsend – Maryland
  Jack Hillgard – Northwestern
  Collen Warner – Portland
  James Dice – Saint Louis
  Alex Sweetin -Saint Louis
  Austin Neil – Tulsa
  Tony Tchani – Virginia
  Austin da Luz – Wake Forest

1 goal

  Teal Bunbury – Akron
  Kofi Sarkodie – Akron
  Mori Avi Hana – Boston College
  Colin Murphy – Boston College
  Charlie Rugg – Boston College
  Sean Rosa – Brown
  Brendan Burgforf – Bucknell
  Adam Gross – Charlotte
  Dan Keat – Dartmouth
  Matt Kuhn – Drake
  Kenan Malicevic – Drake
  Michael Noonan – Drake
  Cole Grossman – Duke
  Trae Harrison – Duke
  Christian Ibeagha – Duke
  Ryan McDaniel – Duke
  Andrew Wenger – Duke
  Tony Walls – Green Bay
  Andre Akpan – Harvard
  Adam Rousmaniere – Harvard
  Richard Smith – Harvard
  Will Bruin – Indiana
  Phil Bannister – Loyola Maryland
  Vincent Ocampo – Loyola Marymount
  Jason Herrick – Maryland
  Drew Yates – Maryland
  Rubin Bega – Michigan State
  Heath Melugin – Missouri State
  Lance Rozeboom – New Mexico
  Billy Schuler – North Carolina
  Kirk Urso – North Carolina
  Akil DeFreitas – North Carolina State
  Piero Bellizzi – Northwestern
  Jeb Brovsky – Notre Dame
  Bright Dike – Notre Dame
  John Schaefer – Notre Dame
  Brian Forgue – Penn State
  Drew Chrostek – Portland
  Ryan Luke – Portland
  Max Alvarez – Sacramento State
  Bryan Baker – Sacramento State
  Scott Crandall – Sacramento State
  Michael Roach – Saint Louis
  Adam Jahn – Stanford
  Daniel Leon – Stanford
  Adoni Levine – Stanford
  Dominique Yahyavi – Stanford
  Fredrik Brustad – Stetson
  Bernardo Añor – South Florida
  Sébastien Thurière – South Florida
  Blaine Gonsalves – Tulsa
  Ashley McInnes – Tulsa
  Jose Parada – Tulsa
  Chandler Hoffman – UCLA
  Ryan Hollingshead – UCLA
  Fernando Monge – UCLA
  Kyle Nakazawa – UCLA
  Shawn Guderian – UNC Wilmington
  Daniel Roberts – UNC Wilmington
  Neil Barlow – Virginia
  Ari Dimas – Virginia
  Jordan Evans – Virginia
  Hunter Jumper – Virginia
  Brian Ownby – Virginia
  Anthony Arena – Wake Forest
  Corben Bone – Wake Forest
  Andy Lubahn – Wake Forest
  Sam Redmond – Wake Forest
  Husref Jopic – Western Illinois
  Said Abdi – Winthrop
  Cameron Alksnis – Winthrop

See also
NCAA Men's Soccer Championship

References

NCAA Division I Mens Soccer
NCAA Division I Men's Soccer Tournament seasons
NCAA Division I men's soccer tournament
NCAA Division I men's soccer tournament
NCAA Division I men's soccer tournament